The Green's Silverline, Cigaritis greeni, is a species of lycaenid or blue butterfly. It is endemic to Sri Lanka.

Notes and references

Cigaritis
Butterflies of Sri Lanka